Scream is the third studio album by Swedish synthrock band Melody Club. It was first released on November 8, 2006.

Track listing
Feed on Me
Last Girl on My Mind
Crash
Scream
Destiny Calling
Fever Fever
Sweet Thing
Walk of Love
Don't Fake the Real Thing
You Are Not Alone
Evil Thing

Their song "Fever Fever" also featured in EA Sports game, FIFA 08.

Chart positions

References

2006 albums
Albums produced by Klas Åhlund
Albums produced by Thomas Troelsen
Melody Club albums